Alcohol dehydrogenase class 4 mu/sigma chain is an enzyme that in humans is encoded by the ADH7 gene.

Function 

This gene encodes class IV alcohol dehydrogenase 7 mu or sigma subunit, which is a member of the alcohol dehydrogenase family. Members of this family metabolize a wide variety of substrates, including ethanol, retinol, other aliphatic alcohols, hydroxysteroids, and lipid peroxidation products. The enzyme encoded by this gene is inefficient in ethanol oxidation, but is the most active as a retinol dehydrogenase; thus it may participate in the synthesis of retinoic acid, a hormone important for cellular differentiation. The expression of this gene makes it much more abundant in the stomach than the liver, thus it differs from the other known gene family members.

References

Further reading

External links